Stacy Philpott is an American ecologist who is a professor at the University of California, Santa Cruz. Her research considers agroecology and the conservation of biodiversity. She was elected a Fellow of the Ecological Society of America in 2021.

Early life and education 
Philpott studied science at the University of Washington. She moved to the University of Michigan for doctoral research, where she studied ecology and evolutionary biology. She joined the Ecological Society of America as a student in 2000. Her doctoral research considered the diversity and ecology of coffee agroecosystems. Philpott spent two years as a postdoctoral fellow at the National Zoological Park.

Research and career 
Philpott started her independent scientific career at the University of Toledo. In 2012, Philpott joined the faculty at the University of California, Santa Cruz. Her research considers insect ecology and the relationships between biodiversity and ecosystem status.

Philpott makes use of urban community gardens to understand ecological relationships. She studies the agroecosystems in 25 gardens across the coastline of California. At the same time, Philpott investigates coffee agro-forestry and the role of ants as a form of pest control in agro-forestry systems. She has studied the biodiversity of dung beetles, and the benefits they provide to ecosystems.

Philpott was elected Fellow of the Ecological Society of America in 2021.

Selected publications

References 

Living people
University of Michigan alumni
University of Washington alumni
University of California, Santa Cruz faculty
American ecologists
Fellows of the Ecological Society of America
Year of birth missing (living people)